This is a list of William & Mary Tribe football players in the NFL Draft.

Key

Selections

References

William and Mary

William and Mary Tribe NFL Draft